Bromcom Computers plc is a British technology company. It provides schools and colleges with a Management Information System and handheld data capture devices to record and track pupil performance.

History

Bromcom Computers plc (Bromcom) was founded in 1986 by computer scientist Ali Guryel as a private company serving business-to-business alongside sister company Frontline Technology Ltd. These companies were formed following the establishment of a sole proprietary company selling microcomputers.

In the early 1990s, EARS (Electronic Attendance Registration System) was created by Bromcom. This initially was an A4 computer folder for teachers to take pupil attendance electronically, replacing the traditional paper register. It appeared on BBC's Tomorrow's World in January 1994.

In 1996, Bromcom enhanced /EARS to include a number of new featuresprimarily Electronic GradeBook and the Two Way Link to SIMS Software. In 1998 Bromcom launched a new range of computer folders with a larger LCD screen and PC-style QWERTY keyboard. In later models, the size was reduced to A5 size with models m-PDA. 

In June 2000, Bromcom launched a 'Parent Portal', MyChildAtSchool.com, to enable pupil's parents to access information about their child's academic performance via the internet. MyChildAtSchool.com was revised in 2009 with a new interface created by graphic designers.

In 2000, Bromcom launched the Bromcom e-School adapting e-commerce technology to schools. e-School brings automated online Internet-based data management of pupils across the school, to LEA/EAZs, to parents and to teachers working from home on their PC over the Internet.

By the end of 2000, Bromcom introduced the PCMCIA/PC-CARD based on the PC-1340 PC Card to enable Windows-based laptops and handhelds to perform registration via the wNET network. The following year saw the arrival of Bromcom's next generation registration computer folder, the SmartPDA. 

In 2003, e-Markbook was created, an automatic and electronic tool integrating with the school's existing MIS system. This was closely followed by e-Behaviour, a software module to monitor and track pupil behaviour - both positive and negative via a points system.

In 2004, Bromcom MIS (Management Information System) developments started and was completed in 2008, based on proven browser platform developed on Microsoft.NET technology since 2001.

Bromcom has been described by Becta as one of the seven largest suppliers of school management information systems.

While Bromcom were the first to launch a full cloud based MIS back in 2011, their cloud journey started in 2000 with the start of their MyChildAtSchool product, a secure way of letting parents see the information, whilst CAPITA, who hold the majority of the market share, are yet to fully launch their Cloud based MIS.

Bromcom is named as one of the approved Government Procurement Service (GPS) suppliers for both its Management Information System and Virtual Learning Platform on the Information Management and Learning Services framework (IMLS).

In 2013 Bromcom won Telford & Wrekin Council Framework contract for school MIS. 

Bromcom was awarded a contract on the Government's G-Cloud 5. 

Early in 2016, Bromcom won ARK academies, Harris federation and the Minerva Learning Trust Framework contracts for the school’s MIS.

Corporate affairs

Bromcom systems for accessing student's data require substantial interoperability directly with the schools Management Information Systems (MIS). Since the 1990s the most widely used MIS in the UK has been Capita's SIMS.

In 1999 Capita did not cooperate with Bromcom's request for improved interoperability in order to write back to Capita's database. In light of this, Bromcom took a complaint to the OFT, and sought OFT support to secure this cooperation. The OFT agreed with Bromcom that Capita was obliged to cooperate with Bromcom to provide the necessary interoperability. Capita agreed to cooperate, and provided documentation that allowed the means of writing back to Capita's database which was then a file-sharing database called Clipper.

Capita moved over to a Microsoft SQL database in 2003/4, and hence a new arrangement was required to provide interoperability. Bromcom charged Capita with abuse of its dominant position by its offer of a new interface "at an unreasonable price and on uncompetitive terms", again referring the matter to OFT. The issue was settled through the OFT in May 2003 by Capita providing the required interoperability via a  'voluntary assurance'.

In 2005, recognizing the serious issues posed by the overwhelming market dominance of SIMS and the lack of competition, Becta commissioned a report called "Management Information Systems and Value for Money". Becta established a Schools Interoperability Framework (based on the model used in the United States) which education products could easily comply with and interoperate. The director of SIMS, however, claimed that the implementation of these standard interfaces would incur a significant cost to their software.

In 2009, Bromcom Computers plc brought a case against Capita to the Office of Fair Trading, alleging that Capita has been abusing its dominant position.

Bromcom stated that Capita's charges for contracts and dominance in the UK schools software market has led to schools over paying by £75.4 million over a ten-year period. The complaint to the OFT follows recommendations made in 2005 by Becta's School Management Information Systems and Value for Money report, a number of which remain outstanding.

In September 2010, Becta published a report entitled "School management information systems and value for money 2010" which was carried out by Atkins Ltd stating the impact on the MIS marketplace of statutory returns, interoperability approaches and the arrangements for the provision of local authority support. Their findings showed that the school MIS marketplace is "still uncompetitive..., still dominated by a single supplier, and still distorted due to the impact of the statutory returns process which increases costs to schools thus increasing the burdens on local authorities and mitigating in particular against smaller providers."

IMLS framework

In March 2012, a new framework agreement was created in a £575m deal with the Department for Education. 18 suppliers were appointed under the new framework, including Bromcom, Capita, Serco, RM and ScholarPack (Histon House Ltd). The agreement was set up by the Government Procurement Service on behalf of the DfE.

Bromcom Computers plc was selected to be part of lot 1 (officially recognised supplier of information management systems) to schools as well as lot 2 (officially recognised supplier of learning (platform) services).

Notes

External links
 Truancy cut by computer revolution — BBC News

Software companies of the United Kingdom
Companies established in 1986
Companies based in the London Borough of Bromley
1986 establishments in the United Kingdom